"It Takes More" is a song by British rapper Ms. Dynamite, released as her debut single from her first album, A Little Deeper (2002), on 20 May 2002. It reached number seven on the UK Singles Chart, her second-highest-charting song on the chart. The melody is taken from the song "Chitarra romana", a popular Roman song written by C. Bruno (pseudonym of Bruno Cherubini) and Eldo Di Lazzaro in 1934.

Versions
There are two versions that were released, album and radio edit. For the radio edit, Ms. Dynamite re-wrote her lyrics instead of using the censor option. On clean versions of A Little Deeper, a censored version is used, bleeping out inappropriate content. The album version was released on physical UK CD singles.

Track listing
UK CD
 "It Takes More (Bloodshy Main Mix)" – 4:39
 "Dynamite"
 "It Takes More' (Nash Band Mix)"

Charts

Weekly charts

Year-end charts

Release history

References

2002 debut singles
2002 songs
Ms. Dynamite songs
Music videos directed by Jake Nava
Polydor Records singles
Songs written by Ms. Dynamite